{{Infobox person
| name               = Eric del Castillo
| image              = Eric del Castillo in 2017.jpg
| alt                = 
| caption            = Del Castillo in 2017
| birth_name         = J. Eduardo Eric del Castillo-Negrete Galván
| birth_date         =  
| birth_place        = Celaya, Guanajuato, Mexico
| death_date         = 
| death_place        = 
| spouse             = Roxana Billini Santamaría (1964 - 1967 Div.)Kate Trillo Graham (m. 1969)
| children           = 3, including Kate del Castillo
| years_active       = 1959-present<ref name="EC13">[http://www.televisa.com/telenovelas/lo-que-la-vida-me-robo/noticias/659642/eric-del-castillo-recibe-homenaje/ Eric del Castillo recibe homenaje.] Artículo publicado por Televisa el 11 de noviembre de 2013. Consultado 07-10-2014.</ref>
| other_names        = 
| occupation         = Actor
| known_for          = 
}}

J. Eduardo Eric del Castillo-Negrete Galván (born 22 July 1934) is a Mexican actor of theater, film and television who has dabbled as a screenwriter, director and arguer film, beginning his career in the Golden Age of Mexican cinema.

Early years and studies
Del Castillo was born in the Juárez Hotel of the city of Celaya, Guanajuato. Eldest son of rural teacher Aurora Galván Valenzuela (1901-1992) and Eduardo Del Castillo-Negrete Rivera (1907–1948), firefighter who lost his life in the fire of the hardware store called "La Sirena" in Mexico City.

His brothers are Federico (actor, 1936-1980) and Leopoldo. When he was young, his parents divorced and in 1945 his mother remarried. He studied in schools of the Government in San Luis Potosí, and after the death of his father in 1948, the Government offered scholarships to the children of deceased firefighters so that they could study in the school of their choice. Del Castillo was a rebellious youth, and on the instructions of his mother, in 1952 he joined the Mexican seminary for foreign missions in Mexico City and was a member of the Congregation of the missionaries of Guadalupe, priestly studies that he abandoned in 1953. Not knowing what to do with his life, Del Castillo thought about studying medicine. However, his mother encouraged him to study acting and in 1954 he joined the Film Institute, theater and broadcasting of the National Association of actors (ANDA) directed by Andrés Soler.

 Career 
 Theatre 
He began his career in the early 1950s as an actor in experimental theater in separate assemblies. He has participated in more than 40 plays: Réquiem para una monja (1957), La Llorona (1959) of Fernando Wagner, Señoritas a disgusto (1962), Cada quien su vida (1968), Tócame la negra (1980), among others.

 Television and film 
Throughout his years in acting, Del Castillo  personified frequently rough, energetic and vigorous characters. In 1959 he participated in La marca del Gavilán, film belonging to the films of the series of Aventuras del Látigo Negro. After several years of minor interventions, in 1962 he was the protagonist in Rostro infernal. From those years, his career began to consolidate and continues to the present day. He has participated in about 300 films: Tiburoneros (1962), La Generala (1970), Perro callejero (1978), Vagabunda (1993), among others.

In 1976, he made the argument of the film Víbora caliente, under the direction of Fernando Durán Rojas, as well as be part of the cast. Later, he starred in the film El extraño hijo del sheriff (1982), where he also collaborated as a writer. That same year, he directed and starred in the film Las Sobrinas del Diablo. He has acted in more than 45 soap operas since his debut in 1962 with La herencia. Its holdings include Duelo de pasiones, Alondra (1995), La Mentira (1998), Un gancho al corazón (2009). In 2010 had an award-winning participation in the melodrama of Nicandro Díaz González Soy tu dueña. He also appeared on the small screen in Abismo de pasión (2012), Lo que la vida me robó (2013–14), Que te perdone Dios (2015), and Tres veces Ana'' (2016).

Filmography

Films

Television roles

Awards and nominations

Daughters
Veronica del Castillo
Kate del Castillo

References

External links 
Eric del Castillo Biography of Eric del Castillo

1934 births
Mexican male film actors
Mexican male telenovela actors
Male actors from Guanajuato
People from Celaya
Mexican people of Spanish descent
20th-century Mexican male actors
21st-century Mexican male actors
Living people